Wilrich Coetzee (born 20 May 1997) is a New Zealand swimmer. He competed in the men's 200 metre butterfly event at the 2018 FINA World Swimming Championships (25 m), in Hangzhou, China.

References

External links
 

1997 births
Living people
New Zealand male butterfly swimmers
Place of birth missing (living people)
20th-century New Zealand people
21st-century New Zealand people